Etlingera muluensis is a monocotyledonous plant species described by Rosemary Margaret Smith. Etlingera muluensis is part of the genus Etlingera and the family Zingiberaceae. No subspecies are listed in the Catalog of Life.

References 

muluensis
Taxa named by Rosemary Margaret Smith